Players and pairs who neither have high enough rankings nor receive wild cards may participate in a qualifying tournament held one week before the annual Wimbledon Tennis Championships.

Seeds

  Andreja Klepač /  Darya Kustova (first round)
  Camille Pin /  Selima Sfar (first round)
  Chan Chin-wei /  Angela Haynes (qualifying competition)
  Yuliana Fedak /  Mervana Jugić-Salkić (qualified)
  Rika Fujiwara /  Aiko Nakamura (qualified)
  Edina Gallovits /  Katalin Marosi (qualified)
  Mathilde Johansson /  Raluca Olaru (first round)
  Marta Domachowska /  Lilia Osterloh (first round)

Qualifiers

  Tatjana Malek /  Andrea Petkovic
  Rika Fujiwara /  Aiko Nakamura
  Edina Gallovits /  Katalin Marosi
  Yuliana Fedak /  Mervana Jugić-Salkić

Qualifying draw

First qualifier

Second qualifier

Third qualifier

Fourth qualifier

External links

2009 Wimbledon Championships – Women's draws and results at the International Tennis Federation

Women's Doubles Qualifying
Wimbledon Championship by year – Women's doubles qualifying
Wimbledon Championships